Paul Young (born 11 April 1968 in Saint Catherine Parish, Jamaica) is a retired Jamaican soccer forward who played two seasons in Major League Soccer and several in the USISL and USL A-League.  He also coached Portmore United, Waterhouse F.C. and August Town F.C. in the Jamaica National Premier League.

Player

Youth
Young attended Wolmer's Boys' School (High) where he excelled in football and academics. Young attended Syracuse University where he played soccer from 1990 to 1992.  During his three seasons with the Orange Men, he scored 32 goals and was named as a 1992 second team All American.

Professional
In 1993, Young began his professional career with Hazard United which won the Jamaica National Premier League title.  In 1994, he signed with the Charleston Battery of USISL.  He scored 23 goals in 22 games and was named to the USISL All League team.  In 1995, he exceeded his previous year's goals total with 25 goals in 24 games, again being named to the All League team.  In February 1996, the Columbus Crew selected Young in the 13th round (121st overall) of the 1996 MLS Inaugural Player Draft.  He played only four games for Columbus, spending much of the season with the Rochester Rhinos of the A-League and the South Carolina Shamrocks in the USISL.  He was named to the USISL All League team. The Battery released him at the end of the season.  In 1998, he began the season with the Charleston Battery.  After scoring three goals in seven games, he was called up by the Tampa Bay Mutiny On 19 June 1998. He played fourteen games for the Mutiny, but failed to score a goal.  On 2 November 1998, the Mutiny waived Young. In 1999, he played for the Rochester Rhinos, Hershey Wildcats and Maryland Mania in the USL A-League.

National team
Young was a regular member of the Jamaica national football team during the 1990s.  In 1997, he devoted himself to the national team as it qualified for the 1998 FIFA World Cup. With 28 goals in his 86 appearances, he was also Jamaica's record goalscorer before being surpassed by Luton Shelton.

Coaching
At some point, Young became the head coach of Portmore United in Jamaica National Premier League.  On 27 February 2007, Linval Dixon replaced Young as head coach. In 2007, Young was a coach of a GSA U-13 soccer team in Lilburn, Georgia. In January 2008, Young joined the Jamaica national team technical staff of Rene Simoes but left the staff in late 2008.  He returned to coach Waterhouse F.C. from January until May 2009. After a six-month hiatus to coach under-11 and under-15 boys in Atlanta, Young returned to Jamaica as coach of August Town F.C. in late December 2009 through February 2010.

References

External links
Charleston Battery stats

1968 births
Living people
American Professional Soccer League players
Charleston Battery players
Columbus Crew players
Hershey Wildcats players
Jamaican expatriate footballers
Jamaican expatriate sportspeople in the United States
Jamaican footballers
Jamaica international footballers
Major League Soccer players
Maryland Mania players
People from Saint Catherine Parish
Rochester New York FC players
South Carolina Shamrocks players
Tampa Bay Mutiny players
A-League (1995–2004) players
USISL players
USL Second Division players
USISL Select League players
Portmore United F.C. players
August Town F.C. managers
Association football forwards
Jamaican football managers